Funaki-ike Dam  is an earthfill dam located in Hyogo Prefecture in Japan. The dam is used for irrigation. The catchment area of the dam is 0.9 km2. The dam impounds about 16  ha of land when full and can store 1615 thousand cubic meters of water. The construction of the dam was started on 1947 and completed in 1959.

See also
List of dams in Japan

References

Dams in Hyogo Prefecture